Elections to Brighton and Hove City Council on the south coast of England were held on 3 May 2007. The whole council (a unitary authority) was up for election and all 54 councillors were elected.

The Conservative Party won 26 out of 54 seats on the council, replacing the Labour Party as the largest party and formed a minority administration. This result was to some extent in line with the general pattern of results throughout England that day, with Conservatives gaining seats at the expense of Labour and the Liberal Democrats. The Green Party increased its number of seats from 6 to 12.

Following the election, the composition of the council was as follows:

Election result

|}

Ward results

Brunswick and Adelaide

Central Hove

East Brighton

Goldsmid

Hangleton and Knoll

Hanover and Elm Grove

Hollingdean and Stanmer (until 2008 known as Hollingbury and Stanmer)

Hove Park (until 2009 known as Stanford)

Moulsecoomb and Bevendean

North Portslade

Patcham

Preston Park

Queen's Park

Regency

Rottingdean Coastal

South Portslade

St Peter's and North Laine

Westbourne

Wish

Withdean

Woodingdean

External links
 Results on council site
 Results on BBC site
 Images and video from inside the polling stations and count

2007 English local elections
2007
21st century in Brighton and Hove
2000s in East Sussex